Apotomops spomotopa is a species of moth of the family Tortricidae that is endemic to Peru.

The ground colour of the forewings is white, mottled with grey overscaling distally. The hindwings are white, but pale beige in the apical region.

Etymology
The species name is the genus name spelled backwards, creating a palindrome.

References

External links

Moths described in 2003
Endemic fauna of Peru
Moths of South America
Euliini
Taxa named by Józef Razowski